Rakshapurushan is a Malayalam movie directed by Nalini Prabha Menon which got released in theaters on 24 May 2019, starring Deepak Menon and Manju Sankar.

Plot
The movie revolves around the story of a police officer named Stephen whose life got upside down due to a custodial death case

Cast 

 Deepak Menon 
 Manju Sankar

Songs
There are two songs in the movie which got released through Zee Music. Jibin George Sebastian is the music composer and lyricist of the songs. The song Parayu engu nee is sung by Vijay Yesudas and the song Pranayam en kanavil is sung by Najim Arshad.

References

2010s police films
Fictional portrayals of the Kerala Police
2010s Malayalam-language films